The Mangfall Mountains, or sometimes Mangfall Alps, are the easternmost part of the Bavarian Prealps that, in turn, belong to the Northern Limestone Alps. The name comes from the river Mangfall, whose tributaries, the Rottach, Weißach, Schlierach and Leitzach, drain large parts of the area and form an important drinking water reservoir for the city of Munich.

Geography

Location 
The mountain region is bounded by the Isar valley in the west, the Inn valley in the east, the Brandenberg Alps (the Rofan) and the Austrian state border in the south. North of the Mangfalls lies the Alpine Foreland. The region has an area of  752.40 km²  or, by narrower definitions, only 333 km².

The Mangfall Mountains are divided into the Tegernsee Mountains (from the Isar to the line Tegernsee−Rottach−Weiße Valepp), Schliersee Mountains (to the Leitzach valley) and the Wendelstein Group (between the Leitzach glacial valley and the Inn valley).

Peaks 
The Wendelstein lies a few kilometres further northeast of the Rotwand, but is separated from it by a valley. Another popular destination is the Brünnstein.

These and the other main peaks in the Mangfall Mountains are (sorted by height in metres (m) above Normalnull (NN):
 Rotwand (1.884 m), Miesbach district
 Großer Traithen (1.852 m), Rosenheim district
 Wendelstein (1.838 m), Rosenheim district
 Risserkogel (1.826 m), Miesbach district
 Schinder (1.808 m), Miesbach district
 Ruchenköpfe (1.805 m), Miesbach district
 Plankenstein (1.768 m), Miesbach district
 Kaserwand (1.690 m), Rosenheim district
 Brecherspitz (1.683 m), Miesbach district
 Monte Scanapà (1.669 m), Rosenheim district
 Hochsalwand (1.625 m), Rosenheim district
 Brünnstein (1.619 m), Rosenheim district
 Seebergkopf (1.538 m), Rosenheim district
 Großer Riesenkopf (1.337 m)
 Madron (942 m), Rosenheim district
 Petersberg (847 m), Rosenheim district

Lakes 
Like the Alps as a whole, the Mangfall Mountains were heavily affected by the last ice age (Würm glaciation). For example, lakes like the Tegernsee, and the typical U-shaped valleys were formed by glaciers.

References

External links 

Miesbach (district)
Bavarian Prealps
Mountain ranges of Bavaria